Of Stone, Wind, and Pillor is an EP by American metal band Agalloch. It was originally meant to be released on 7" vinyl in December 1998 by Iron Fist Productions (with only the first three songs), but that did not occur. It was later released in 2001 via The End Records with two additional tracks: "Kneel to the Cross", recorded in 2001, and "A Poem by Yeats", recorded in 2000. This release was limited to 2,500 copies. The cover artwork, Le Cerf Se Voyant Dans L'Eau, was by Gustave Doré.

Lyrics in the song "A Poem by Yeats" have been taken from W. B. Yeats's poem "The Sorrow of Love". "Kneel to the Cross" is a Sol Invictus cover.

Track listing

Personnel
 John Haughm – vocals, guitar, drums
 Don Anderson – guitar
 Jason William Walton – bass
 Shane Breyer – keyboards
 Gustave Doré – artwork
 Ronn Chick – synthesizer, engineer, mastering, mixing

References

Agalloch albums
2001 EPs